Robert Leigh is a Canadian physicist.

Robert Leigh may also refer to:
Robert K. Leigh (1852–c. 1924), English-born Hong Kong architect and civil engineer
Sir Robert Holt Leigh, 1st Baronet (1762–1843) of the Leigh baronets
Robert Leigh, Irish politician
 Robert Devore Leigh American political scientist and Bennington College founding president.

See also

Robert Lee (disambiguation)